State elections were held in South Australia on 3 March 1956. All 39 seats in the South Australian House of Assembly were up for election. The incumbent Liberal and Country League led by Premier of South Australia Thomas Playford IV defeated the Australian Labor Party led by Leader of the Opposition Mick O'Halloran.

A redistribution occurred in 1955 based upon the results of the census held in June 1954.

Background
Labor won one seat, rural Murray from the LCL. The LCL won two seats, rural Wallaroo from Labor and rural Chaffey from an independent. An independent won one seat, rural Burra from the LCL.

Results

|}

 The primary vote figures were from contested seats, while the state-wide two-party-preferred vote figures were estimated from all seats.

Post-election pendulum

See also
Results of the South Australian state election, 1956 (House of Assembly)
Candidates of the 1956 South Australian state election
Members of the South Australian House of Assembly, 1956-1959
Members of the South Australian Legislative Council, 1956-1959
Playmander

Notes

External links
Two-party preferred figures since 1950, ABC News Online

Elections in South Australia
1956 elections in Australia
1950s in South Australia
March 1956 events in Australia